Tyler Kroft (born October 15, 1992) is an American football tight end for the San Francisco 49ers of the National Football League (NFL). He played college football at Rutgers. He was drafted in the third round, 85th overall, in the 2015 NFL Draft by the Cincinnati Bengals. He has also played for the Buffalo Bills and New York Jets.

Early years
Kroft attended Downingtown East High School in Downingtown, Pennsylvania. He played tight end and wide receiver for the football team. He was rated by Rivals.com as a three-star recruit. He committed to Rutgers University to play college football.

College career
Kroft was redshirted as a freshman in 2011 at Rutgers. As a redshirt freshman in 2012, he played in 11 games and had three receptions for 59 yards and a touchdown. As a redshirt sophomore in 2013, Kroft started 12 of 13 games, including a career-best 133 yards against Arkansas in game 4. On the season, he had a team-leading 43 receptions and 573 yards, along with four touchdowns, and was a first-team all-conference selection. Kroft started 12 of 13 games as a redshirt junior in 2014, but took on a restricted role and reached neither five receptions nor 50 yards in any of them. On the season, he had 24 receptions for 269 yards. He was awarded the "Loyal Knight" award for his willingness to scale back.

After his redshirt junior season, he entered the 2015 NFL Draft. He finished his collegiate career with 70 receptions for 901 yards and five touchdowns.

College statistics

Professional career

Cincinnati Bengals

2015 season

Kroft was drafted by the Cincinnati Bengals in the third round, 85th overall, in the 2015 NFL Draft. He played back-up to Pro Bowl tight end Tyler Eifert. He caught his first career touchdown in Week 16 against the San Francisco 49ers on a 20-yard pass from A. J. McCarron. He played in all 16 games his rookie season with six starts, recording 11 receptions for 129 yards and one touchdown.

2016 season

Kroft was third on the depth chart behind Eifert and C. J. Uzomah for much of the season, compiling ten receptions for 92 yards off the bench.

2017 season

Kroft began the season behind Tyler Eifert, but after Eifert was injured in Week 2, Kroft took the starting role. In Week 4, he had six receptions for 68 yards and two touchdowns against the Browns, leading the team and setting career bests in all three categories. In Week 9, he had a career-long 59-yard reception against Jacksonville en route to a career-best 79 receiving yards. In Weeks 11 and 12 he had back-to-back receiving touchdowns for the first time in his career, both of one yard; the one in Week 11 occurred after teammate Dre Kirkpatrick returned an interception 101 yards, but committed an unforced fumble just before reaching the end zone. He finished the 2017 season with 42 receptions for 404 receiving yards and seven receiving touchdowns.

2018 season

Kroft suffered a foot injury in Week 5 and missed the next five games in hopes he could return. He was placed on injured reserve on November 16, 2018, officially ending his season. He played in five games and finished with four receptions for 36 yards.

Buffalo Bills

2019 season

On March 13, 2019, Kroft signed a three-year $18.75 million contract with the Buffalo Bills. On May 20, on the first day of OTAs, he broke his foot during practice, which required surgery. Kroft finished the season with six catches for 71 yards and a touchdown, which he scored during a Week 15 game against the Pittsburgh Steelers in the fourth quarter, allowing the Bills to win 17–10 and clinch a playoff spot.

2020 season

In Week 3 against the Los Angeles Rams, Kroft filled in for injured starter Dawson Knox, catching four passes for 24 yards and two touchdowns, including the game-winning score from Josh Allen as Buffalo won 35–32. Kroft was placed on the reserve/COVID-19 list by the team on November 14, 2020, and activated on November 19. He was placed back on the COVID-19 list on January 2, 2021, and activated again two days later. Overall, he finished the 2020 season with 12 receptions for 119 receiving yards and three receiving touchdowns.

New York Jets
Kroft signed a one-year contract with the New York Jets on March 22, 2021. On November 9, 2021, Kroft was placed on injured reserve after suffering a chest injury in Week 9. He was activated on December 18.

Kroft finished the season with 16 catches for 173 yards and a touchdown in nine games, starting six.

San Francisco 49ers
On May 23, 2022, Kroft signed with the San Francisco 49ers.

NFL career statistics

Personal life
Kroft is married to Lexi Kroft. Their daughter Grace was born October 23, 2020.

References

External links
Buffalo Bills bio
Rutgers Scarlet Knights bio

1992 births
Living people
American football tight ends
Buffalo Bills players
Cincinnati Bengals players
New York Jets players
People from Downingtown, Pennsylvania
Players of American football from Pennsylvania
Rutgers Scarlet Knights football players
San Francisco 49ers players
Sportspeople from Chester County, Pennsylvania